The list of ACC national champions begins in the Atlantic Coast Conference's first full academic year of competition in 1953 and totals 153 NCAA team national championships and 8 FBS national championships in football. ACC members won a total of five national championships in the 2020–21 school year—in fencing (Notre Dame), field hockey (North Carolina), men's lacrosse (Virginia), women's lacrosse (Boston College) and in women's swimming and diving (Virginia).

Listed below are all championship teams of NCAA sponsored events, as well as the titles won in football, which is not an official NCAA-sanctioned championship. Up to 1982, teams representing member schools also claimed five Association for Intercollegiate Athletics for Women championships.

Totals by school
The following table ranks the current ACC schools by the number of NCAA recognized national championships each school has won as an ACC member. This does not include Division I-A/FBS football championships, or Association for Intercollegiate Athletics for Women championships.

Fall sports

Men's cross country (1)

 Prior to joining the ACC in 2013, Syracuse won one NCAA team title in 1951.
 In 2015, Syracuse won its second NCAA team title with a score of 82 points, beating out Colorado (91) and Stanford (151). Syracuse was led by Justin Knight (4th), Colin Bennie (8th), and Martin Hehir (9th), and an All-American performance from Philo Germano (39th) secured the victory. Joel Hubbard (47th) rounded out the scoring for the Orange. The coaching staff included Brien Bell, Adam Smith and Head Coach Chris Fox, who was subsequently named USTFCCCA National Men's Coach of the Year.

Women's cross country (6)

Field hockey (22)

Football (8)

The NCAA does not name an official champion for Division I-A/FBS football. The following table lists national titles that are reported by the NCAA's web page.

Prior to joining the ACC in 1978, Georgia Tech was named national champion in 1917, 1928, and 1952 by the Helms Athletic Foundation.
Prior to joining the ACC in 2004, Miami was named national champion in 1983 (AP & UPI), 1987 (AP & UPI), 1989 (AP & Coaches), 1991 (AP), and 2001 (AP, Coaches, BCS).
Prior to joining the ACC in 2005, Boston College claims a national championship in 1940.
Prior to joining the ACC in 2013, Pittsburgh claims national championships in 1915, 1916, 1918, 1929, 1931, 1934, 1936, 1937, and 1976. Other sources credit the Panthers with up to 8 additional national championships. See Pitt football national championships for more details.
 Notre Dame, which joined the ACC in non-football sports in 2013 but remains an FBS independent, officially claims 11 national titles. Many sources, however, credit the Fighting Irish with 13 titles. See Notre Dame Fighting Irish football national championships for more details.

Men's soccer (17)

Women's soccer (24)

 Prior to joining the ACC in 2013, Notre Dame won three national titles (1995, 2004, 2010).

Winter sports

Men's basketball (15)

 Prior to joining the ACC in 2013, Syracuse won one NCAA title (2003). 
 Prior to joining the ACC in 2014, Louisville won two NCAA titles (1980, 1986). A third title in 2013 was vacated due to NCAA sanctions stemming from a major sex scandal.
 Prior to 1939 the NCAA did not sanction a post-season tournament to determine a national champion.  Some schools claim basketball national championships based on polls from this era. Four current ACC schools claim pre-1939 national titles:
 North Carolina (1924)
 Notre Dame (1927, 1936)
 Pittsburgh (1928, 1930)
 Syracuse (1918, 1926)

Women's basketball (3)

 Prior to joining the ACC in 2013, Notre Dame won one NCAA title (2001).

Men's ice hockey (3)

The ACC does not sanction men's ice hockey.  Boston College competes as a member of Hockey East.  The Eagles also won national championships in 1949 and 2001 prior to their joining the ACC in 2005.

Women's indoor track and field (1)

Women's swimming and diving (1)

Fencing (3)

 The ACC reinstated fencing as a sponsored sport in the 2014–15 school year.
 Prior to joining the ACC in 2013, Notre Dame won a total of eight national team titles: three men's (1977, 1978, 1986), one women's (1987), and four combined titles (1994, 2003, 2005, 2011).

Spring sports

Baseball (2)

Prior to joining the ACC in 2004, Miami won national championships in baseball in 1982, 1985, 1999, and 2001.

Men's golf (4)

Prior to joining the ACC in 2013, Notre Dame won an NCAA national championship in men's golf in 1944.

Women's golf (7)

Prior to joining the ACC in 2004, Miami won the DGWS championship in 1970, AIAW championships in 1972, 1977, and 1978, and an NCAA national championship in 1984.
Prior to joining the ACC in 1991, Florida State won the AIAW championship in 1981.

Men's lacrosse (21)

Note: the NCAA began sanctioning men's lacrosse in 1971.  Prior championships were awarded by the United States Intercollegiate Lacrosse Association.
Prior to becoming a charter member of the ACC in 1953, Maryland won non-NCAA national championships in 1928, 1936, 1937, 1939, and 1940.
Prior to becoming a charter member of the ACC in 1953, Virginia won a non-NCAA national championship in 1952.
Prior to joining the ACC in 2013, Syracuse won four non-NCAA national championships (1920, 1922, 1924, 1925) and 10 NCAA national championships (1983, 1988, 1989, 1993, 1995, 2000, 2002, 2004, 2008, 2009). Another championship in 1990 was vacated due to NCAA violations.

Women's lacrosse (17)

Men's outdoor track and field (2)

Florida State's 2007 national championship was vacated by the NCAA's Committee on Infractions.

Women's rowing (2)

Softball (1)

Women's tennis (2)

Men's tennis (5)

 Prior to joining the ACC in 2013, Notre Dame won one NCAA team title (1959, shared with Tulane).

See also
List of NCAA schools with the most NCAA Division I championships

References

National champions
Atlantic Coast Conference